There are over 9,000 Grade I listed buildings in England.  This page is a list of these buildings in the district of Cheltenham in Gloucestershire.

Cheltenham

|}

Notes

References 
National Heritage List for England

External links

Cheltenham